"Chasin' You" is a song co-written and recorded by American country music singer Morgan Wallen. It was released in July 2019 as the fourth single from his 2018 studio album, If I Know Me. Wallen wrote the song, along with Jamie Moore and Craig Wiseman.

Commercial performance
"Chasin' You" became Wallen's third consecutive Number One hit on the Billboard Country Airplay chart dated May 23, 2020, reaching the top in its 42nd week. In December 2020, it was declared the number one song of the year, making it Wallen’s second consecutive song to achieve such a distinction. It also reached a peak of number two on the Billboard Hot Country Songs chart and top 20 on the Billboard Hot 100.

As of March 2020, the song has sold 57,000 copies in the United States, and it was certified Platinum by the RIAA on June 18, 2020.

Music video
The music video for "Chasin' You" premiered on January 4, 2019, ahead of its release as a single. Labeled as "Chasin' You (Dream Video)", it was filmed in black and white and shows Wallen driving around Nashville, Tennessee in a convertible.

Charts and certifications

Weekly charts

Year-end charts

Certifications

References

2019 singles
Morgan Wallen songs
Country ballads
2010s ballads
Songs written by Craig Wiseman
Songs written by Morgan Wallen
Song recordings produced by Joey Moi
Big Loud singles
Billboard Country Airplay number-one singles of the year
2018 songs
Black-and-white music videos